Michael Fahey may refer to:
 Mike Fahey, mayor of Omaha, Nebraska
 Michael F. Fahey, United States Marine Corps general